Providence Academy is a private, co-ed, Catholic college-preparatory school (PreK–12) at 15100 Schmidt Lake Road, Plymouth, Minnesota.  It is located in the Roman Catholic Archdiocese of Saint Paul and Minneapolis.

References

External links
Providence Academy Website

Roman Catholic Archdiocese of Saint Paul and Minneapolis
Schools in Hennepin County, Minnesota
Catholic secondary schools in Minnesota
Educational institutions established in 2001
Private middle schools in Minnesota
Private elementary schools in Minnesota
Private high schools in Minnesota
2001 establishments in Minnesota